Danny Ho is a former Hong Kong international lawn bowler.

Bowls career
Ho has represented Hong Kong at the Commonwealth Games, in the fours event at the 1986 Commonwealth Games.

He won three silver and four bronze medals at the Asia Pacific Bowls Championships.

References

Hong Kong male bowls players
Living people
Bowls players at the 1986 Commonwealth Games
Year of birth missing (living people)